Pescocostanzo is a comune and town of 1038 inhabitants in the Province of L'Aquila in the Abruzzo region of Italy. It is a tourist destination, attracting people from all over Italy due to its landscape and environment. It is part of the National Park of Maella, and the I Borghi più belli d'Italia (Most Beautiful Towns of Italy) association.  In winter, Pescocostanzo is a destination for skiers and snowboarders, and has its own ski resort. The towns of Roccaraso and Rivisondoli are close by.

Images

See also
Santa Maria del Colle
Hermitage of Saint Anthony
Hermitage of San Michele Arcangelo

References

External links

 I Borghi più belli d'Italia (it / en)
 Pescocostanzo Portal (it)
 Abruzzo Ski World Cup (it)
 (it)

 
Hilltowns in Abruzzo